Zero Degree Atoll is a Maldivian band, formed in 1987. Since their formation, the band has released three albums.

Band history

From Zero Degree Atoll website.

Formation
Zero Degree Atoll formed in 1987. Their debut song Reethi Handhuvaru was produced together with Worldview International Foundation and the Ministry of Home Affairs of the Maldives. In 1988, the band began to work on their first album.

Active Years

They represented the Maldives thrice at the International Tourism Fair (ITB) in Berlin, in 1993, 1995 and 1997.

Today
Zero Degree Atoll has disbanded after the passing of frontman Nashid in 2016.

Discography
From Zero Degree Atoll website.
Dhoni (1996)
Island Pulse (1997)
Bird in Flight (2003)

References

Musical groups established in 1987
Maldivian musical groups